Cassandra Kell  (born 8 August 1980) is a female Australian football goalkeeper.

She was part of the Australia women's national soccer team  at the 2004 Summer Olympics. On club level she played for New South Wales Sapphires.

See also
 Australia at the 2004 Summer Olympics

References

External links
 
 
 http://www.soccerpunter.com/players/292023-Cassandra-Kell
 FIFA.com
 http://www.ussoccer.com/stories/2014/03/17/13/57/u-s-women-move-on-to-olympic-quarterfinals-with-1-1-draw-with-australia-will-face-japan-on-friday
 http://articles.latimes.com/2003/sep/26/sports/sp-cuproundup26
 http://www.gettyimages.com/detail/news-photo/australian-goalie-cassandra-kell-punches-the-ball-away-from-news-photo/2537779#australian-goalie-cassandra-kell-punches-the-ball-away-from-chinas-picture-id2537779

1980 births
Living people
Australian women's soccer players
Place of birth missing (living people)
Footballers at the 2004 Summer Olympics
Olympic soccer players of Australia
Women's association football goalkeepers
Australia women's international soccer players
2003 FIFA Women's World Cup players
People educated at St Peter's Catholic College, Tuggerah